Elite Dangerous is a space flight simulation game developed and published by Frontier Developments. The player takes the role of a pilot (colloquially referred to as "Commander" or "CMDR") of a spaceship, and explores a realistic 1:1 scale, open-world representation of the Milky Way galaxy, with the gameplay being open-ended. The game is the first in the series to attempt massively multiplayer gameplay, with players' actions affecting the narrative story of the game's persistent universe, while also retaining a single-player mode. Elite Dangerous is the fourth game in the Elite video game series. It is the sequel to Frontier: First Encounters, released in 1995.

Having been unable to agree to a funding deal with a publisher for many years, Frontier began its Kickstarter campaign in November 2012. Pre-release test versions of the game had been available to backers since December 2013, and the final game was released for Windows in December 2014, with the macOS version later released in May 2015. A "preview" version of the game for Xbox One was later released via the Xbox Game Preview Program in June 2015 during Microsoft's briefing at the Electronic Entertainment Expo 2015, and was fully released in October 2015, while a PlayStation 4 version was released on 27 June 2017. Elite Dangerous additionally supports all PC virtual reality devices.

Elite Dangerous Odyssey, which adds first-person shooter play on planetary surfaces and inside bases to the game, does not support virtual reality. Instead, the on foot player traverses these environments while wearing goggles lacking the depth perception that is normally provided by a full virtual reality experience. This effectively limits the player to viewing the environment through a "static rectangular window", much like carrying around a large "viewing monitor" directly in front of the field of view.

By the end of April 2015, Elite Dangerous had sold over 500,000 copies, with Frontier Developments expected to generate £22 million from sales. As of 15 January 2019, cumulative sales of Elite Dangerous exceeded 4.3 million franchise units, composed of 3 million base game units and 1.3 million Horizons expansion units. In April 2020 the sales of Elite Dangerous base game units had passed 3.5 million. During an interview published on 23 October 2020, Frontier CFO Alex Bevis announced that Elite Dangerous had generated more than £100 million of revenue.

Gameplay 

Upon its release in 2014, Elite Dangerous began in year 3300 and has been in sync with UTC albeit 1286 years in the future. The game is set around 45 years after Frontier: First Encounters. Elite Dangerous retains the basic premise of previous games – players start with a spaceship and a small amount of money in an open galaxy and role-play in various activities to acquire more money and merit. These activities include trading, mining, exploration, passenger-transportation, bounty-hunting, piracy and assassination.

The game is the first in the series to feature online multiplayer with access to a massively multiplayer persistent world called Open Play, as well as an online-only single player mode. Open Play gameplay is similar to Eve Online in that many actions that would be considered griefing in other multiplayer games are generally permitted, as long as there is a valid roleplaying reason (e.g. robbery, extortion and blocking off star systems). However, some actions, such as "mob mentality" persecution of players, exploiting mechanics of the game (such as quitting the game in the middle of a fight to avoid death), and swearing are not allowed, and could result in a ban from the main server.

Money earned throughout the game can be spent on upgrading ships or buying new ones. Players can customize their ships by changing modules, i.e., engines, weapons, energy, scanners, etc. With the second in-game currency called Arx (also buyable with real money), players can purchase visual changes for their ships, like other coloring or cosmetic parts.

Within the virtual galaxy, the player can explore some 400 billion star systems complete with planets and moons that rotate and orbit in real time, reflecting dynamic day-night cycles. Around 150,000 of the game's star systems are taken from real astronomical data, while a few partially fictional planetary systems, which were created in Frontier and First Encounters before a significant number of exoplanets were discovered, are carried over. For example, none of the gas giants of the Fomalhaut system correspond with the detected properties of Fomalhaut b. A handful of entirely fictional systems named in the original Elite, and also featured in later games, are included (e.g. the original starting system Lave). The remainder are procedurally generated according to scientific models. Players can dock their ships at space stations and outposts located throughout the galaxy in star systems to trade goods, purchase new spacecraft, re-arm their ship, effect repairs and do missions from Mission Boards. Players may also find lost cargo or encounter other ships while in flight by investigating Unidentified Signal Sources.

Factions 
There are three major factions, the Empire of Achenar, the Federation, and the Alliance of Independent Systems. Patch 1.3, which launched in June 2015, featured the Power Play addition which introduced competitive, galactical faction challenges. Players can ally themselves with an in-game faction and contribute to it by completing faction missions while also earning various rewards. The collective outcome of each faction's achievements determines faction powers, territorial control, and their proceeding objectives. Each faction has their own line of ships that are obtained by acquiring ranks within the respective faction, except Alliance ships which are not locked behind a ranking system. The Federation has four ships made by an in-game federal corporation called Core Dynamics. The Empire has four ships manufactured by Gutamaya, an Imperial corporation. The Alliance has three ships, none of which require rank, manufactured by Lakon Spaceways.

Player roles and rank 
There are three archetypal player roles attached with individual rankings (also known as player status) separate from faction rankings: Combat, Exploration, and Trading. Players gain experience points and rank in these areas by completing activities that are divided among the three roles. For example, a bounty-hunter destroying pirates will gain Combat experience points and progress in Combat rank. On 15 March 2015, the first player who reached Triple Elite status (Elite rank in Combat, Elite rank in Exploration, and Elite rank in Trading), the highest status, won £10,000. A certain status or rank with a faction can grant access permits to a number of systems that require them. Benefits also include ship discount prices.

Development 
Starting in 2012, Elite Dangerous was developed using Frontier Development's own in-house COBRA game development engine. Frontier had been working on the game as a skunk-works background activity for some time prior to its Kickstarter launch, with other projects being prioritised.

On 14 November 2014, one month before launch, David Braben announced the removal of the game's offline single player mode, the developers having decided that they could not deliver an acceptable offline-only experience based on the original design. The Windows version of the game was released on 16 December 2014.

On 4 March 2015, Microsoft announced at the Game Developers Conference that Elite Dangerous would be released on Xbox One and was later launched in early access as part of Microsoft's Game Preview program during E3 in 2015.  On 2 April 2015, the game was made available on Steam with support for cross-buy between the Windows version and the Mac version, the latter being released in May 2015. Although there are no plans for a Linux version of the game, Braben stated in 2014 that "There is no reason why COBRA cannot run on Linux, running through OpenGL." A version for PlayStation 4 was released on 27 June 2017. The support of the Mac Version ended with the update 3.3 on 12 December 2018

Braben has said that Thargoids, the warlike, insectoid aliens from the original games, would make an appearance in some capacity. Mission objectives introduced in May 2015 about ancient specimens fueled speculation of the coming introduction of the Thargoid species. On 5 January 2017, the Thargoids were possibly encountered by a player. The ship encountered was alien in nature. Through an escalation of encounters, it was eventually revealed the encountered race was in fact Thargoids. While initially Thargoid encounters were non-violent, a number of space stations have since been attacked leading to missions based on investigating, researching, and gathering materials to increase weapon effectiveness against the Thargoids.

On 25 October 2016, an extinct alien race, the Guardians, were added, with players allowed to explore the ancient ruins they left behind in order to gather data and materials to unlock special Guardian modules and specialized Human–Guardian hybrid weapons with increased effectiveness against Thargoid ships. Thematically, the Guardians were discovered in the year 3302.

On 9 April 2020, Fleet Carriers were added to the game, allowing players to own essentially mobile space stations for private use, though they are limited to one per player. They are exorbitantly (though not entirely prohibitively) expensive in terms of ingame currency, owing partially to the fact that they also require periodic refueling stops.

Funding 
At the 2011 Game Developers Conference, following a presentation on the development of the original Elite, Braben was asked in a Q&A session if Elite 4 was still on the drawing board. He replied "yes, it would be a tragedy for it not to be". The project had difficulty in attracting sufficient funding, which Braben had attributed to the traditional publishing model, which he saw as being biased against games with no recent comparable predecessors.

Braben had previously discussed crowdfunding as a possible solution in April 2012. Public fundraising commenced in November 2012 using the Kickstarter website, the campaign lasting 60 days, with the aim being to raise £1.25m and deliver a finished game by March 2014. Braben described the campaign as a way of "test-marketing the concept to verify there is broader interest in such a game", in addition to raising the funds.

Following the end of the Kickstarter, further public funding was sought through the developer's UK website, via PayPal. By April 2014, £1.7m had been raised, and Braben had reacquired the legal rights to the Elite franchise. Although the game's original total development budget had been £8 million, by September 2014 this had, in Braben's words, "grown by quite a lot".

In 2017, Frontier announced Tencent had acquired a 9% stake of Frontier Development.

Testing phase 
A playable alpha version of the game was released to certain Kickstarter backers in December 2013. In May 2014, the game entered the first phase of its beta test, focusing primarily on testing the systems and servers with a greater number of players. A pre-release "gamma" build was released to backers three weeks before launch, to give them a head start on other players. On 2 April 2015, the beta Mac version went live, accessible to all backers.

Horizons season of expansions 
The first "season" of expansions for Elite Dangerous, named Horizons, was announced on 5 August 2015 at Gamescom, entered beta on 30 November 2015 and was released on 15 December 2015 for PC, followed by a 3 June 2016 release for Xbox One. Frontier Developments currently has no plans to release the expansion for Mac OS X unless Apple provides support for compute shaders, which Frontier believes are required to render planet surfaces and other objects. Elite Dangerous: Horizons is a separately priced product. Original customers who also purchased Horizons  received exclusive access to the Cobra Mk. IV ship.

Horizons adds planetary landings, ground vehicles and bases, synthesis of consumables and temporary ship upgrades, ship-launched fighters, passenger missions, a character creator, and co-op multicrew support for larger ships. Planetary landings feature procedurally generated planets, initially supporting only worlds without an atmosphere. Players can choose to set down at planetary bases or at any point of their choosing and can deploy a new eight-wheeled ground vehicle called the SRV ("Surface Reconnaissance Vehicle"). This vehicle is equipped with weapons, a "wave scanner" for finding resources, shipwrecks etc., a datalink system for hacking into bases, and thrusters that can lift the vehicle up above the ground for short periods of time. Thrusters in the wheels can be used to affix it to the ground on low-gravity worlds. Materials found on planets can be combined to boost ship jump range, synthesize repair materials, or upgrade weapons.

Horizons is billed as a season of five expansions, starting with planetary landings and then followed with a more comprehensive looting and crafting system released in May 2016, ship-launched fighters and passenger missions released in October 2016, and support for multiple players working cooperatively on the same ship planned for a future expansion within the first half of 2017 ahead of PlayStation 4 release and with a 5th expansion to follow after that. The 2nd, 3rd and 4th expansions were announced originally for spring, summer and autumn 2016 respectively. But the 5th expansion had no reference to "winter", was not time-scheduled and had no content description, only stating a cryptic "soon" reference. The ability to walk around and the types of worlds players can land on is expected to be expanded during upcoming seasons, with landing on planets with atmospheres or earthlike worlds not being part of the Horizons season, but due at a later stage.

On 24 February 2017, due to the new discovery in the Trappist-1 system, the 2.3 update would be delayed to put it in the game. The 2.3 update called The Commanders was released on 11 April 2017, five days earlier than originally said. It consists of a 'Commander Creator' (also known as the Holo-Me), Multicrew and various other features. The 2.4 update called "The Return", with an expanded storyline for the alien Thargoids, was released on 26 September 2017.

On 27 October 2020, Horizons became a free update for the base game for PC, PlayStation, and Xbox users. People who purchased the expansion before it was free received an exclusive Azure paint job which is compatible with all ships.

Beyond 

Beyond is the official title for the series of updates (3.0 onwards) which followed Horizons. It focused on improvements to the core gameplay along with improvements to the game's crime and punishment system, better trading data, new wing missions, new ships (including the Alliance Chieftain, Krait, and alien Thargoid scouts), more interaction with megaships and installations, a "tech broker" offering more advanced weapons, in-game Galnet audio, an overhaul of mining, new astronomical anomalies to discover, and improvements to planetary visuals and more detailed surface environments. An open beta for 3.0 was released on 25 January 2018, with official launch of "Chapter One" on 27 February 2018. Subsequent "Chapters" were released across each quarter of 2018 culminating in the release of "Chapter Four" on 11 December 2018 that brought night vision capabilities along with a completely redesigned exploration system, planetary probes, and a Full Spectrum Scanner (FSS) tool for scanning unexplored star systems.

Odyssey expansion 

Odyssey was announced by Frontier Developments on 3 June 2020 via a video trailer and summary post on their official forums, with launch scheduled for 19 May 2021.  The paid DLC will let players explore worlds on foot, undertake ground missions that, much like their cosmic counterparts, include diplomatic gigs, commercial ventures and combat; find work, assistance and shops in social hubs all across the galaxy, meeting fellow pilots in person rather than peering at them through a cockpit window.

Referred to as "New Era" in prior communications, full production on Odyssey began in Summer 2018 with a large majority of the Elite development team allocated to it.  While a paid-update to Elite Dangerous basegame owners, Lifetime Expansion owners will receive it as part of their Pass.  It was originally planned for the Elite Dangerous major update to release in December 2020, but in the context of the current COVID-19 environment, Frontier set a release date of 19 May 2021.

The first in-game footage of Odyssey was shown at The Game Awards 2020 in the form of a minute long gameplay trailer showcasing some of the new features that come with the DLC, including First-person shooter like gameplay and avatars walking around on planetary surfaces.

On 13 January 2021, Frontier Developments announced that their release roadmap for Odyssey had shifted as a result of the on-going COVID pandemic: the PC version of Odyssey was now slated to release in late spring 2021, while the PS4 and Xbox One versions have been delayed to autumn 2021.  On 22 April 2021, a release date of 19 May 2021 was announced for the PC version of Odyssey.

From 29 March – 5 May 2021, a public alpha build of Odyssey was available. It was split into four phases, with each phase opening more of the game up. In phase 1, players were unable to access their ships, which meant that they were only able to get around using the newly added "Apex Interstellar" taxi service, and they were limited to a single star system. From phase 2 onward, players were able to access ships and could access other star systems. Phase 3 was focused around new exploration features, meaning that players could purchase exploration tools and a Genetic Sampler to study any Flora that they happened upon. Phase 4 imported players' accounts from the main game to test compatibility. The alpha was limited, and a lot of features from the final release of the DLC were cut off. Before the alpha ended, text appeared on screen that said (paraphrased) "See you all on May 19th, So Long, and Thanks for All the Fish!"

On 19 May 2021, Frontier Developments released the DLC on PC. The launch was followed by major issues of client/server stability, several gameplay bugs, and inadequate performance for PC clients stated within the hardware requirements. It resulted in a "Mostly negative" global review on Steam store.
Players also complained widely on both Steam and the official forum about a steep increase in time to collect instrumental resources, broken mechanics, and missing end game activities.
Frontier Developments have subsequently released 7 major updates with the first 5 released on a weekly schedule. These focused on stability and bug fixes, with critical performance issues left to be addressed in later updates in the run up to the planned console release.

On 4 June 2021, Frontier Developments announced the focus of Updates 3, 4 and 5, postponing the performance optimization to following console related development.

On 12 July 2021, Frontier Developments announced that console release has been delayed indefinitely.

On 29 July 2021, Frontier Developments released update 6 with declared corrections to missions, POIs, interface problems, and the addition of AMD's FSR technology to address in minor measure performance issues for affected hardware configurations by downgrading and then scaling the effective resolution. This update introduced new severe issues (e.g. certain mission types weren't available in stations, and certain engineering unlocks were inaccessible for some users, and players would occasionally be charged for weapon modifications that weren't actually applied to the ship) and did little to address long-standing critical performance issues.

On 7 September 2021, Frontier Developments released an Issue Report announcing at the same time the focus of the Updates 7 and 8 while postponing to 2021 the addressing of some major issues, including problems with anti-aliasing and a limited framerate.

On 22 September 2021, Frontier Developments released update 7 after being postponed for several weeks, which fixed many outstanding issues, added quality of life changes, and optimized some game features. Previous performance issues remain unresolved, but Frontier Development's official update notes mention "tweaks made to hopefully positively contribute toward current player performance issues".

On 10 March 2022, Frontier CEO David Braben announced on the company's forums that all further content development for console versions of Elite: Dangerous was being cancelled, citing the need to move the game's story forward by focusing on a single, post-Odyssey codebase.

Elite Dangerous: Arena 
Simultaneously announced and launched on 16 February 2016, Elite Dangerous: Arena was a low-priced standalone version of the CQC (Close Quarters Combat) arena mode from Elite Dangerous allowing newcomers and those who already have Elite Dangerous to compete against each other. The corresponding game mode in Elite Dangerous was also renamed from "CQC" to "Arena" on the same day.

From 7 to 11 July 2016, the game was offered for free on Steam. On 10 February 2017 it was removed for sale on Steam but it remains available as a play mode from the main Elite Dangerous game.

Reception 

Elite Dangerous received an aggregated score of 80/100 on Metacritic based on 52 critics, indicating that the game received "generally positive reviews" from critics.

Chris Thursten of PC Gamer rated the game 86/100, considering it to be "potentially a classic", depending on Frontier's ability to build on the "broad but somewhat shallow foundations" of the released version. Thursten described the gameplay experience as "exhilarating excitement, matched by nothing else this year, contrasted with moments of emptiness, frustration, and boredom". Dan Whitehead of Eurogamer gave the game 8/10 and considered it to be "probably the most immersive and compelling recreation of deep space ever seen in gaming", while finding some of the gameplay repetitive. Andy Kelly of GamesRadar gave the game 4/5, calling it a "compelling space sandbox" and a "welcome return" of the Elite franchise, but felt that the game at launch was "missing a lot of important features, especially when it comes to multiplayer". Roger Hargreaves of the Metro gave it 7/10, describing the game as a "solid start" that had yet to fulfil its potential. Reviewing the game for IGN, Rob Zacny called it "one of the most enthralling and evocative space combat and trade sim games I've ever played" and "also one of the most boring", seeing the balance of "brief, intense emotional peaks and long, shallow valleys of boredom" as "fundamental to Elite's identity". Reviewing a later version of the game in April 2015, after playing the game since launch, Lee Hutchinson from Ars Technica described Dangerous as "so damn good that it transcends its problems". Joel Peterson of Destructoid gave the PlayStation 4 version of the game 9/10, calling it "A hallmark of excellence. There may be flaws, but they are negligible and won't cause massive damage."

The announcement of the removal of the offline mode on 14 November 2014 was met by a number of complaints from customers, with some saying they had backed the game on the understanding that it would feature offline play and others that there had been no prior warning of removal during the whole of the preceding development period. Frontier offered refunds to customers who had pre-ordered the game without playing it, and said that those who had already played the game, in alpha or beta form, would not be eligible for refunds. Later, Braben, speaking for the company, announced that refunds would be judged on a "case-by-case" basis.

The game had sold around 1.7 million units by the end of May 2016. By the end of December 2016 over 2.1 million paid franchise units were sold of Elite Dangerous. As of 15 January 2019, cumulative sales of Elite Dangerous exceeded 4.3 million franchise units, composed of 3 million base game units and 1.3 million Horizons expansion units. In April 2020 the sales of Elite Dangerous base game units had passed 3.5 million. During an interview published on 23 October 2020, Frontier CFO Alex Bevis announced that Elite Dangerous had generated more than £100 million of revenue.

Elite Dangerous won "Best of E3" from The Escapist and games.cz in 2014.  Elite Dangerous won the Game Developers Choice Award 2015 for best audience.  It was ranked as the Best VR Game of 2016 from Game Revolution.  It was nominated for Evolving Game by the British Academy Games Awards (BAFTA) in 2017.  The game was also nominated for the "Still Playing" award at the 2019 Golden Joystick Awards.  Elite Dangerous: Beyond was nominated for "Evolving Game" at the 2019 British Academy Games Awards.

See also 
 List of space flight simulation games

Notes

References

External links 
 

2014 video games
Active massively multiplayer online games
Cooperative video games
Crowdfunded video games
Early access video games
Dangerous
Faster-than-light travel in fiction
Frontier Developments games
HTC Vive games
Kickstarter-funded video games
Multiplayer and single-player video games
Multiplayer vehicle operation games
Oculus Rift games
Open-world video games
MacOS games
PlayStation 4 games
PlayStation 4 Pro enhanced games
Science fiction video games
Space flight simulator games
Space massively multiplayer online role-playing games
Space trading and combat simulators
Video game sequels
Video games set in the 4th millennium
Virtual economies
Windows games
Xbox Cloud Gaming games
Xbox One games
Video games using procedural generation
Video games with 6 degrees of freedom
Game Developers Choice Award winners
Video games developed in the United Kingdom